No. 19 Group was a group of the Royal Air Force, active from 1918, and then from 1941-1969.

History

It was formed in April 1918 as No. 19 (Equipment) Group in York, but disbanded in June.

Second World War

It was reformed in early 1941 as No. 19 (General Reconnaissance) Group, Coastal Command, at Mount Wise, Plymouth. Among its squadrons during the war was No. 461 Squadron RAAF.

Its units in February 1942 included:
No. 19 Group RAF (GR), under command of  Air Commodore G.R. Bromet, CBE, DSO

Cold War

19 Group assets during October 1946:

The group relocated to RAF Mount Batten in 1947.

In 1953, initial NATO documents instructing Admiral Creasey, newly appointed Commander-in-Chief, Eastern Atlantic Area (CINCEASTLANT), wrote that Air Vice Marshal Thomas Traill, CB, OBE, DFC, Royal Air Force, Air Officer Commanding No. 19 Group RAF, had been appointed as Air Commander North-East Atlantic Sub-Area.

19 Group assets during July 1954:

Before it became HQ Southern Maritime Air Region in November 1969, its last commander appears to have been Air Vice-Marshal Cresswell Clementi.

Air Officer Commanding No. 19 Group RAF
Air Officers Commanding of No. 19 Group:

 1941–1942: Air Commodore G. H. Boyce
 1942–1943: Air Vice-Marshal G. R. Bromet
 1943–1944: Air Vice-Marshal B. E. Baker
 1944–1945: Air Vice-Marshal F. H. M. Maynard
 1945–1947: Air Vice-Marshal C. B. S. Spackman
 1947–1950: Air Vice-Marshal F. L. Hopps
 1950–1952: Air Vice-Marshal G. R. C. Spencer
 1952–1954: Air Vice-Marshal T. C. Traill
 1954–1956: Air Vice-Marshal G. W. Tuttle
 1956–1959: Air Vice-Marshal G. I. L. Save
 1959–1962: Air Vice-Marshal L. W. C. Bower
 1962–1964: Air Vice-Marshal S. W. R. Hughes
 1964–1967: Air Vice-Marshal J. Barraclough
 1967–1968: Air Vice-Marshal J. H. Lapsley
 1968–1969: Air Vice-Marshal C. M. Clementi

References

Citations

Bibliography

19
Military units and formations established in 1918
Military units and formations disestablished in 1969